Events from the year 2017 in Canada.

Incumbents

The Crown 
 Monarch – Elizabeth II

Federal government 
 Governor General – David Johnston  (until October 2), then Julie Payette 
 Prime Minister – Justin Trudeau
 Parliament – 42nd

Provincial governments

Lieutenant Governors 
Lieutenant Governor of Alberta – Lois Mitchell
Lieutenant Governor of British Columbia – Judith Guichon
Lieutenant Governor of Manitoba – Janice Filmon
Lieutenant Governor of New Brunswick – Jocelyne Roy-Vienneau
Lieutenant Governor of Newfoundland and Labrador – Frank Fagan
Lieutenant Governor of Nova Scotia – John James Grant (until June 28), then Arthur LeBlanc
Lieutenant Governor of Ontario – Elizabeth Dowdeswell
Lieutenant Governor of Prince Edward Island – Frank Lewis (until October 20), then Antoinette Perry
Lieutenant Governor of Quebec – J. Michel Doyon
Lieutenant Governor of Saskatchewan – Vaughn Solomon Schofield

Premiers 
Premier of Alberta – Rachel Notley
Premier of British Columbia – Christy Clark (until July 18), then John Horgan
Premier of Manitoba – Brian Pallister
Premier of New Brunswick –  Brian Gallant
Premier of Newfoundland and Labrador – Dwight Ball 
Premier of Nova Scotia – Stephen McNeil
Premier of Ontario – Kathleen Wynne
Premier of Prince Edward Island – Wade MacLauchlan
Premier of Quebec – Philippe Couillard
Premier of Saskatchewan – Brad Wall

Territorial governments

Commissioners 
 Commissioner of Yukon – Doug Phillips
 Commissioner of Northwest Territories – vacant (until June 26; Gerald W. Kisoun [acting]), then Margaret Thom
 Commissioner of Nunavut – Nellie Kusugak

Premiers 
Premier of the Northwest Territories – Bob McLeod
Premier of Nunavut – Peter Taptuna (until November 21), then Paul Quassa
Premier of Yukon – Sandy Silver

Events

January

January 26 – A farmer's market in Calgary was destroyed in a fire. 32 vendors were affected.
January 29 – A Quebec City mosque was the subject of a mass shooting. There were six deaths and numerous others injured.

February
February 6 – Sapphire Jubilee of Elizabeth II's accession as Queen of Canada

March

March 5 – Marked the start of a major blizzard that affected most of western and northern Manitoba and eastern Saskatchewan.  A number of schools were shut down for the first time in thirty years. It was caused by a cyclone-intense Colorado Low.
March 12 Daylight saving time goes into effect
March 18 – Jason Kenney is elected as leader of the Alberta PC Party.

April

April 5 – end of May – Floods hit Eastern Canada, with Quebec the hardest hit. Two people are killed and 2,720 are forced from their homes. Montreal declared a state of emergency.
April 22 – 19 year old Serena McKay is beaten to death by two female classmates in Sagkeeng First Nation, Manitoba. The case provoked outrage, with the videos of the murder being posted online.

May

May 9 – The British Columbia general election resulted in no single party winning a majority.
May 27 – The Conservative Party of Canada leadership election was won by Andrew Scheer, replacing interim leader Rona Ambrose.
May 29 – The Green Party of British Columbia announced that they would support the British Columbia New Democratic Party in the Legislative Assembly. This would result in a minority government and NDP leader John Horgan becoming the 36th Premier of British Columbia.
May 30 – The Nova Scotia general election resulted in a majority government and re-election for the Liberal Party, led by Premier Stephen McNeil.

June
June 13 – A Twitter account known as "CanadaCreep" is reported to police.  The account was shut down, dozens of terabytes of data were seized by police and a Calgary man faced voyeurism charges.
 June 19 – An amendment is made to the Canadian Human Rights Act and Criminal Code to add a prohibition against discrimination of transgendered individuals.

July
July 1 – Canada celebrates the sesquicentennial anniversary of Canadian Confederation.
July 6 – September 20 – Wildfires in British Columbia result in the evacuation of 39,000 people, the burning of 1,212,336 hectares and the destruction of at least 305 buildings. 
July 18 – Ratification of the Agreement on the Cree Nation Governance between the Cree people of Eeyou Istchee and the government of Canada.
July 18 – Former nurse and serial killer Elizabeth Wettlaufer is sentenced to eight concurrent life terms in prison,  after pleading guilty to eight murders and four counts of attempted murder. All her victims had been elderly patients under her care, whom she had injected with large doses of insulin.
July 28 – Opening ceremony of the 2017 Canada Summer Games in Winnipeg.

August
August 10 – Premier of Saskatchewan, Brad Wall, announces his pending retirement from politics.
August 21 A partial solar eclipse takes place across Canada
August 31 Ontario teachers and education workers contracts expires and the new contracts take effect

September
September 30 – 2017 Edmonton attack; A suspected terrorist vehicle ramming attack occurs in Edmonton. Five people are injured and the suspect is taken into police custody.

October
October 1 – Jagmeet Singh wins the 2017 NDP leadership election, becoming the first visible minority and first Sikh to lead a major federal political party in Canada.

November 
 November 6 – Abbotsford Police Department officer John Davidson is shot and killed while responding to a stolen car incident.
October 16 to November 20 – Ontario college strike

December 
 December 17 – an extension to Line 1 Yonge–University on the Toronto subway opens 
 Late December – January 2018 – A cold wave brings record low temperatures to much of the country.

Arts, literature and sports

Art

Film

Music

Television

Sports 

July 9 – The Canada men's national under-19 basketball team wins the 2017 FIBA Under-19 Basketball World Cup for the first time.
September 23 to September 30 – The 2017 Invictus Games are held in Toronto
November 4 – Georges St-Pierre becomes 1st Canadian UFC Middleweight Champion by defeating Michael Bisping at UFC 217.
December 9 – Toronto FC becomes the first team in Major League Soccer history to win the domestic treble and the first Canadian team to win MLS Cup. (see also: 2017 Toronto FC season)

Deaths

January

 January 1 – 
Yvon Dupuis, politician
 Stuart Hamilton, musician and broadcaster (b. 1929)
 Bill Marshall, film producer, co-founder of the Toronto International Film Festival, Toronto political campaign manager (b. 1939)
 January 2 – Tom Harpur, classicist, theologian, priest, and journalist
 January 3 – 
Mike Buchanan, ice hockey player 
Peter Pollen, mayor of Victoria, British Columbia (1971–1975, 1981–1985)
January 25 – Marcel Prud'homme, MP (1964–1993) and Senator (1993–2009)
January 26 – Raynald Guay, former MP (1963–1980)
January 28 – Sang Chul Lee, Moderator of the United Church of Canada (1988–1990)
January 31 – Rob Stewart, film director and conservationist

February 
 February 19 – Bob White, trade unionist
 February 22 –
 Gordon Gray Currie, politician and sports coach
 John McCormack, ice hockey player
 February 23 – 
 Don Cousens, politician
 Bernie Custis, football player and coach
 February 28 – Pierre Pascau, journalist and radio host

March
March 3 – Aquinas Ryan, politician and educator
March 4 – 
Bonnie Burnard, short story writer and novelist
Edna Rose Ritchings, symbolic maintainer of the International Peace Mission movement
March 8 – Margaret Mitchell, politician
March 11 – Richard Wagamese, writer
March 12 – Harvey Smith, politician
March 13 – Ed Whitlock, long-distance runner
March 14 – Arleene Johnson, baseball player
March 15 – Laurent Laplante, journalist, essayist and detective writer
March 19 – 
Bob Robertson, comedian (Double Exposure)
Len Mitzel, politician
March 20 – 
Betty Kennedy, broadcaster, journalist, author, and Senator
Terence Finlay, Anglican bishop
March 21 – Bill Rompkey, politician
March 23 – Denis McGrath, screenwriter and producer
March 25 – Gary Doak, ice hockey player
March 27 – Beau Dick, Northwest coast artist
March 28 – Janine Sutto, actress and comedian

April
April 2 – André Drouin, Hérouxville city councillor and author of the Hérouxville Standards 
April 6 – Peter Savaryn, lawyer and former Chancellor of the University of Alberta 
April 9 – Bill Sutherland, ice hockey player 
April 11 – Mark Wainberg, HIV/AIDS researcher and activist 
April 18 – Ron Moeser, Toronto city councillor 
April 20 – Paul Hébert, actor and director
April 23 – Charles Foster, writer
April 25 – Sasha Lakovic, ice hockey player
April 27 – Peter George, 6th President and Vice-Chancellor of McMaster University

May
May 2 – 
Paul MacEwan, politician
Gerry Martiniuk, politician
May 3 – Georgie Collins, film, stage, and television actress
May 8 – John David Molson, businessman and former president of the Montreal Canadiens
May 9 – Ron Atkey, lawyer, law professor and politician
May 10 – Ted Hibberd, ice hockey player
May 13 – Marcel Pelletier, ice hockey player and management official
May 15 – Stan Kaluznick, football player
May 17 – Michael Bliss, historian and author  
May 20 – Roger Tassé, lawyer and civil servant  
May 21 – Bill White, ice hockey player.
May 24 – Grace McCarthy, politician
May 25 – Saucy Sylvia, comedian, pianist, singer and radio personality
May 31 – Diane Torr, dancer and performing artist

June
June 4 – Avie Bennett, businessman and philanthropist
June 5 – Marilyn Hall, television and theatre producer
June 8 – Sam Panopoulos, cook and businessman
June 14 – Don Matthews, football player and coach
June 18 – Tim Hauge, mixed martial artist and boxer
June 22 – Hervé Filion, harness racing driver
June 27 – Ric Suggitt, rugby union player and coach
June 29 – Dave Semenko, ice hockey player.

July

July 2 – Smith Hart, professional wrestler
July 5 – John Rodriguez, former Member of parliament and mayor of Greater Sudbury, Ontario
July 12 – Tod Sloan, ice hockey player
July 16 – George A. Romero, American-born horror film director
July 17 – Harvey Atkin, actor and voice actor
July 28 – Maurice Filion, ice hockey coach and general manager

August 
 August 12 – Bryan Murray, ice hockey executive and coach
 August 21 – Boris Spremo, photojournalist and Order of Canada recipient 
 August 30 – Skip Prokop, drummer and band leader for rock bands The Paupers and Lighthouse

September 

 September 9 – Pierre Pilote, ice hockey player
 September 12 – Allan MacEachen, politician and first Deputy Prime Minister of Canada 
 September 14 – Arnold Chan, lawyer and politician, Member of Parliament
 September 30 – Monty Hall, game show host, producer and philanthropist

October 

 October 16 – John Dunsworth, actor best known for his role in Trailer Park Boys
 October 17 – Gord Downie, lead singer of rock band The Tragically Hip
 October 29 – Richard Hambleton, artist known for his street art

December
 December 5 – August Ames, pornographic actress
 December 13 – Barry Sherman, businessman and philanthropist

Notes

See also
 2017 in Canadian television
 List of Canadian films of 2017

References

 
2010s in Canada
Years of the 21st century in Canada
Canada